Ruth Maria Kubitschek (born 2 August 1931) is a retired German actress born in Czechoslovakia. At the end of World War II her family fled to Köthen. Ruth Maria went to the University for Theater and Music (Hochschule für Theater und Musik) in Halle and then to the German Theater-Institute (Deutsches Theater-Institut) in Weimar. Together with Götz Friedrich she has one son. She was in a relationship with Wolfgang Rademann from 1976 to 2016.

In 2013, she shot her last film, the comedy Frau Ella. Since then she has withdrawn from the public eye, but still exhibits her paintings.

Selected filmography 
 Thomas Müntzer (1956)
  (1961)
 He Can't Stop Doing It (1962)
  (1966, TV miniseries)
 Sperrbezirk (1966)
  (1967, TV series)
  (1967)
 Madame and Her Niece (1969)
  (1970)
 Tears of Blood (1972)
 Monaco Franze (1983, TV series)
 Kir Royal (1986, TV series)
 Fatal Love (1986, TV film)
 Das Erbe der Guldenburgs (1987–1990, TV series)
 Freunde fürs Leben (1992–1996, TV series)
 Schloß Hohenstein (1992–1995, TV series)
 Katrin ist die Beste (1997, TV series)
  (2004, TV film)
 Das Traumhotel (2004–2006, 2014, TV series)
 Cinderella (2011, movie, Italy)
 Frau Ella (2013)

References

Bibliography 
 Goble, Alan. The Complete Index to Literary Sources in Film. Walter de Gruyter, 1999.

External links 

1931 births
Living people
German film actresses
German stage actresses
German television actresses
German voice actresses
Naturalized citizens of Germany
People from Chomutov
Sudeten German people
20th-century German actresses
21st-century German actresses
East German actors
East German women